Fuller's Hoek Pass, (English: Fuller's Corner), is situated in the Eastern Cape, province of South Africa, on a road in the Fort Fordyce Nature Reserve.

Mountain passes of the Eastern Cape